Francis Raymond Callaghan    (15 April 1891 – 10 March 1980) was a New Zealand teacher, agricultural instructor and scientific administrator.

Callaghan was born on 15 April 1891 at Lincoln. He succeeded Ernest Marsden as secretary of the Department of Scientific and Industrial Research (DSIR). He was president of the Royal Society of New Zealand. He retired in 1953 and was appointed a Companion of the Imperial Service Order in the 1953 Coronation Honours. He also received the Queen Elizabeth II Coronation Medal.

Callaghan died on 10 March 1980 in the Christchurch suburb of Halswell.

References

1891 births
1980 deaths
New Zealand educators
New Zealand scientists
Presidents of the Royal Society of New Zealand
People from Lincoln, New Zealand
New Zealand Companions of the Imperial Service Order
People associated with Department of Scientific and Industrial Research (New Zealand)